Sweets for My Sweet is a 1969 album by American recording soul/gospel female group Sweet Inspirations released on Atlantic Records.
The album features the groups cover of "Crying in the Rain" which peaked to #42 on Billboards Hot Soul Singles. The song was originally recorded by The Everly Brothers and reached #6 on Billboards Hot 100 chart.

Other tracks included are covers of Marvin Gayes' hit "Chained" and The Drifters' "Sweets for My Sweet". Following the album's release, 'Sweet Inspirations' lead singer Cissy Houston left the group to pursue a solo career. Houston released several albums, and also supported daughter Whitney Houston throughout her music career.

Track listing
Side A

"But You Know I Love You" - 2:34

"Chained" - 2:15

"It's Not Easy" - 3:06

"Get a Little Order" - 2:05

"Don't Go" - 2:14

"It's All Worth It" - 2:58

Side B

"Sweets for My Sweet" - 2:39

"Every Day Will Be Like a Holiday" - 2:29

"Let Me Be Lonely" - 3:54

"Crying in the Rain" - 2:26

"Always David" - 3:26

Credits
Producer: Tom Dowd
Supervised: Jerry Wexler

Charts

Singles

References

External links
Sweet Inspirations: Sweets for my Sweet

1969 albums
Sweet Inspirations albums
Albums produced by Tom Dowd
Atlantic Records albums